St John Paul II College is a systemic Roman Catholic co-educational high school located in the Canberra suburb of Nicholls in the Australian Capital Territory of Australia. The school is named in honour of Pope John Paul II.

The school caters for boys and girls from years 7-12 who live in  the Gungahlin area and nearby regional areas in New South Wales. The school is part of the Roman Catholic Archdiocese of Canberra and Goulburn.

Curriculum

St John Paul II College follows the Australian Curriculum.

In Year 7 students undertake six subjects, which through a middle school approach, encourages a smooth transition to high school. English, History, Geography and Civics & Citizenship are combined into Integrated Humanities, and Maths and Science are also combined into one subject. This is to make the transition to high school smoother for the students by limiting the number of different teachers and classes.

Subjects are:

 Religious Education
 Integrated Humanities (English, History, Geography, Civics and Citizenship) 
 Integrated Maths and Science
 Physical Education and Health
 LOTE - French or Chinese
 four electives (one a term)

In Year 8 and 9, the integrated subjects are separated into single subjects.

Subjects studied are:

 Religious Education
 English
 Mathematics
 Science
 SOSE (History, Geography, Civics and Citizenship)
 Physical Education and Health
 LOTE - French or Chinese (elective in Year 9)
 four electives (one a term)

See also

 List of schools in the Australian Capital Territory
 Associated Southern Colleges

References

External links
 John Paul College Website

Catholic secondary schools in the Australian Capital Territory
2013 establishments in Australia
Educational institutions established in 2013